Queen Tey (17th century) was queen regnant of Cambodia in 1687. 

She was married to Barom Reachea V, and the mother of King Chey Chettha IV, who ruled five or six times. He first came to the throne in 1675. The position of a queen mother was a very high status position in the Cambodian court at this time period. 

In 1687, the king abdicated in favour of his mother Tey. She reigned for three months. She was the first female monarch in Cambodia since Queen Jyeṣṭhāryā of Sambhupura. After her short reign, she stepped down and returned the throne to her son.

References

17th-century Cambodian monarchs
Cambodian queens
17th-century women rulers
17th-century Cambodian women